Integrated Environmental Solutions Ltd is a climate tech company specialising in the development of physics-based digital twin technology for decarbonising buildings and cities.

History
IES was founded in 1994 by Dr Don McLean, as a spin-off from Strathclyde University. The company is headquartered in Glasgow, Scotland, and has additional offices in Dublin, Atlanta, Melbourne, Singapore and Pune.

In June 2012, the company announced the acquisition of North American consulting firm BVM Engineering (BVME).

In April 2019, the company launched the Intelligent Communities LifeCycle (ICL), a suite of software tools can be used to decarbonise buildings, campuses, communities and cities. The Intelligent Communities LifeCycle (ICL) uses digital twin technology to inform and improve the performance of buildings and to help reach net-zero carbon emission targets.

Software
The IES Virtual Environment (VE) is a suite of building performance analysis applications. It can be used by designers to test different options, identify passive solutions, compare low-carbon & renewable technologies, and draw conclusions on energy use,  emissions and occupant comfort. The VE contains an integrated central data model, which has direct links to SketchUp, Revit, Vectorworks and gbXML, IFC & dxf imports.

iSCAN centralises any time-series data from different building and energy management systems, utility portals, IoT sensors and historic files in one platform. iSCAN organises and analyses data to gain intelligent insights to improve building or portfolio operation and uncover hidden savings.

iCD is a sustainable urban design and early stage masterplanning tool. It can be used to track the impact of changes on key environmental metrics such as solar/PV potential, walkability from transport hubs, impact on resource consumption and building EUIs.

The iVN tool enables local energy decarbonisation by assessing feasibility of distributed energy networks and microgrids. iVN integrates electricity, heat, cooling, and water networks with real or simulated building energy demand data.

The Collaboration Cloud offers a customisable range of operational dashboards, portfolio management and community engagement tools.

Research
The company invest over 1/4 of their turnover in R&D to create new technology for the built environment, and have acquired both National and European funding through Scottish Enterprise, the UK Technology Strategy Board (TSB) and the European Framework Programme 7 (FP7).

References

Companies based in Glasgow